is a papal bull promulgated on 15 June 1520 by Pope Leo X. It was written in response to the teachings of Martin Luther which opposed the views of the Catholic Church. The bull censured forty-one propositions summarised from Luther's writings, and threatened him with excommunication unless he recanted within a sixty-day period commencing upon the publication of the bull in Saxony and its neighboring regions.

Luther refused to recant and responded instead by composing polemical tracts lashing out at the papacy, and by publicly burning a copy of the bull on 10 December 1520. As a result, Luther was excommunicated in 1521.

History

The historical impetus for this bull arose from an effort to provide a decisive papal response to the growing popularity of Luther's teachings. Beginning in January 1520, a papal consistory was summoned to examine Luther's fidelity to Catholic teachings. After a short time, it produced a hasty list of several perceived errors found in his writings, but Curial officials believed that a more thorough consideration was warranted. The committee was reorganized and subsequently produced a report determining that only a few of Luther's teachings could potentially be deemed heretical or erroneous from the standpoint of Catholic theology. His other teachings perceived as problematic were deemed to warrant lesser degrees of theological censure, including the designations "scandalous" or "offensive to pious ears".

Johann Eck subsequently became involved in these proceedings. He had personally confronted Luther a year earlier in the Leipzig disputation and had obtained copies of condemnations issued against Luther by the universities of Cologne and Leuven. In a letter to a friend, Eck said he became involved because "no one else was sufficiently familiar with Luther's errors." Soon after having joined the committee when it was already halfway through its deliberations, he began to exert his considerable influence on the direction it subsequently took.

The committee on which Eck sat consisted of some forty members, including cardinals (among whom was Cardinal Cajetan), theologians and canon lawyers. The heads of the three major mendicant orders, the Dominicans, Franciscans and Augustinians, were represented. Central to the committee's proceedings was the matter of whether (and in what manner) Luther and his teachings should be formally condemned. Some members argued that Luther's popular support in Germany made it too politically risky to issue a bull at that time. The theologians supported an immediate condemnation of Luther. But the canon lawyers advocated a mediating position: Luther should be given a hearing and a chance to defend himself before being excommunicated as a heretic. Ultimately the committee negotiated a compromise. Luther would be given no hearing, but he would be offered a sixty-day window in which to repent before further action would be taken.

Prior to Eck's involvement, Cajetan had expressed his desire that the committee members examine the whole context of Luther's writings and specify careful distinctions among the various degrees of censure to be applied to Luther's teachings. Eck's approach was markedly different. He bulldozed a final decision through the committee to ensure a speedy publication. As a result, the text it ultimately drafted simply contained a list of various statements by Luther perceived as problematic. No attempt was made to provide specific responses to Luther's propositions based upon Scripture or Catholic tradition or any clarification of what degree of theological censure should be associated with each proposition listed. All quoted statements were to be condemned as a whole as either heretical, scandalous, false, offensive to pious ears, or seductive of simple minds. Eck may have employed this tactic in order to associate more strongly the taint of error with all of Luther's censured teachings. However, this  formula for censure had already been employed by the earlier Council of Constance to condemn various propositions extracted from the writings of Jan Hus.

When the committee members had obtained agreement among themselves regarding the selection of forty-one propositions which they deemed to be problematic, they subsequently submitted their draft text to Leo X. He appended a preface and conclusion and issued the document as an official papal bull on 15 June 1520. Copies were printed, notarized, sealed and distributed to specially appointed papal nuncios who were tasked with disseminating the bull, especially in those regions where Luther's followers were most active, and ensuring that its instructions were carried out.

Text

Printed copies of this bull bore the Latin title  ("Bull against the errors of Martin Luther and his followers"), but it is more commonly known by its Latin incipit,  (Arise O Lord). These words also serve to open a prefatory prayer within the text of the bull calling on the Lord to arise against the "foxes [that] have arisen seeking to destroy the vineyard" and the destructive "wild boar from the forest". Both refer to passages of the Bible: "Catch the foxes for us, The little foxes that are ruining the vineyards, While our vineyards are in blossom" (Song 2:15 NASB), and "A boar from the forest eats it away And whatever moves in the field feeds on it. O God of hosts, turn again now, we beseech You; Look down from heaven and see, and take care of this vine" (Ps 80:13–14 NASB). In these poetic metaphors may also be found an echo of Leo X's engagement in the hunting of wild boars while residing at a hunting lodge in the Italian hills during the spring of 1520.

Following additional prayers of intercession directed towards the Apostles Peter and Paul and the "whole church of the saints" to defend Catholicism against Luther, the bull proceeds to list the forty-one propositions previously selected by the committee. The condemned propositions do not cover all disputed points of doctrine advocated by Luther. Many of Luther's important works setting forth his disagreements with Catholic theology, including On the Babylonian Captivity of the Church, had not yet been published when this bull was issued. Moreover, on account of Eck's efforts to speed the committee along, it did not have sufficient opportunity to thoroughly examine the material Luther had already published. Therefore, the list of condemned propositions draws in large part upon the material with which Eck was personally familiar, including the 95 Theses, the lists of censures against Luther issued by the universities at Cologne and Leuven which Eck had brought with him to Rome, and Luther's  (a detailed exposition of the 95 Theses). The selection of censures themselves in large part combines and amplifies those statements already selected as problematic by the universities of Cologne and Leuven.

Some of the condemnations confirmed prior judgments by the papacy. Luther's support for conciliarism is explicitly censured (proposition #28) and is singled out for further condemnation in the bull's conclusion: "[Luther] broke forth in a rash appeal to a future council. This to be sure was contrary to the constitution of Pius II and Pope Julius II our predecessors that all appealing in this way are to be punished with the penalties of heretics. In vain does he implore the help of a council, since he openly admits that he does not believe in a council." Other condemnations represent new papal interventions on matters that had been freely disputed among Catholic scholars and theologians before that time. For example, Luther's opposition to the burning of heretics (proposition #33) and his anti-war stance with respect to the Ottoman Turks (proposition #34) reflect opinions also shared by Desiderius Erasmus. Moreover, Luther explicitly referred to the church father Jerome for support when he opposed the practice of burning heretics.

Leo X then proceeded to issue an authoritative condemnation of these forty-one propositions in the following words:

Additionally, the bull contains a directive forbidding any use of Luther's works and decreeing that they should be burned:

Luther, along with his "supporters, adherents and accomplices", were given sixty days from the publication of this bull in which to desist "from preaching, both expounding their views and denouncing others, from publishing books and pamphlets concerning some or all of their errors". Luther himself was instructed to "inform us of such recantation through an open document, sealed by two prelates, which we should receive within another sixty days. Or he should personally, with safe conduct, inform us of his recantation by coming to Rome."

Reactions

Luther and his sympathizers

The Pope assigned to Eck and Cardinal Girolamo Aleandro the task of publishing this bull in Saxony, its neighboring regions, and the Low Countries.

They found this task more difficult than had initially been anticipated on account of the widespread public support for Luther, particularly in Germany. At Erfurt, students who sympathized with Luther tossed copies of the bull into the local river and at Torgau, a posted copy was torn down and defaced. Even some Catholic bishops hesitated as much as six months before publishing the bull's contents. At times, the opposition faced by Eck and Aleandro was so fierce that their very lives were endangered. At Leipzig, Eck had to retreat for an hour to a cloister in fear for his life.

Eck found his task to be particularly onerous. He had received secret instructions permitting him to include more names under the bull's threat of excommunication at his discretion. This power he chose to exercise by supplementing the bull with the names of several prominent German Humanists and thereby aroused their opposition besides that of Luther's supporters. In the Netherlands, Aleandro also experienced his share of confrontations with Luther's sympathizers. Among those he encountered was Desiderus Erasmus, who declared: "The inclemency of the bull ill comports with the moderation of Leo" and also that "Papal bulls are weighty, but scholars attach much more weight to books with good arguments drawn from the testimony of divine Scripture, which does not coerce but instructs."

For these reasons, its dissemination took several months to complete. Luther himself received an official copy bearing the papal seal in early October of that year. However, rumors of its existence reached Luther well in advance of the official copy. At first he doubted their veracity and thought that the document to which they referred may be a forgery, possibly by Eck himself. Nonetheless he commented that it was the work of the Antichrist, whatever its true origin may be, and started to compose a response even before he had received an official copy. His response was entitled Adversus Execrabile Antichristi Bullam (Against the Execrable Bull of the Antichrist).

Luther defiantly proclaimed in his response that "whoever wrote this bull, he is Antichrist. I protest before God, our Lord Jesus, his sacred angels and the whole world that with my whole heart I dissent from the damnation of this bull, that I curse and execrate it as sacrilege and blasphemy of Christ, God's Son and our Lord. This be my recantation, O bull, thou daughter of bulls."  He subsequently took issue with the  censure of his statements: "My articles are called 'respectively some heretical, some erroneous, some scandalous', which is as much to say, 'We don't know which are which.' O meticulous ignorance! I want to be instructed, not respectively, but absolutely and certainly. [...] Let them show where I am a heretic, or dry up their spittle." Much of the remainder of the tract is devoted to a discussion of the censured propositions.

With the publication of the bull, sporadic public burnings of Luther's works began to take place in Germany in accordance with Leo X's instructions. However, in some places this directive proved impossible or difficult to carry out because of Luther's popular support. On certain occasions, his followers managed to substitute his condemned books with wastepaper or anti-Luther tracts, or rescue some of his works from the flames before they were consumed.

On 29 November 1520, Luther published a second response to the bull entitled Assertion of All the Articles Wrongly Condemned in the Roman Bull. Luther's commentary on proposition number 18 provides a representative example of its general tone: "I was wrong, I admit it, when I said that indulgences were 'the pious defrauding of the faithful'. I recant and say, 'Indulgences are the most pious frauds and imposters of the most rascally pontiffs, by which they deceive the souls and destroy the goods of the faithful. Luther also published his On the Freedom of a Christian that same month. Although this work was not penned as a direct response to the bull, it nevertheless reaffirmed Luther's commitment to certain themes censured therein, including the primacy of ecumenical councils over papal decrees.

On 10 December 1520, sixty days after Luther had received a copy of this bull, he and Melanchthon invited the local university faculty and students to assemble that morning at the Elster Gate in Wittenberg. A bonfire was lit and volumes of canon law, papal constitutions, and works of scholastic theology were burned. Luther himself tossed a copy of the bull into the flames. Having done so, Luther is reported to have said: "Because you have confounded the truth [or, the saints] of God, today the Lord confounds you. Into the fire with you!", a declaration which alludes to Psalm 21:9. Luther's act of defiance reflected deeper motives than a mere retaliatory desire to treat these representations of Catholic authority with the same regard that the papal bull had shown for his own books.  By burning these works, Luther signaled his decisive break from Catholicism's traditions and institutions.

Luther himself later explained his actions that day:

The breach between Luther and the papacy was finalized on 3 January 1521, when on account of Luther's failure to comply, the Pope issued the bull  to declare that he had been formally excommunicated.

Modern

 marks a watershed event in Christian history. Protestant author Philip Schaff notes: "The bull of excommunication is the papal counter-manifesto to Luther's Theses, and condemns in him the whole cause of the Protestant Reformation. Therein lies its historical significance. It was the last bull addressed to Latin Christendom as an undivided whole, and the first which was disobeyed by a large part of it."

However, contemporary scholars of the Reformation widely agree that this bull itself is a "strange document and an evasive assessment of Luther's theological concerns". Schaff notes that the condemned propositions are "torn from the connection [context], and presented in the most objectionable form as mere negations of Catholic doctrines. The positive views of the Reformer are not stated, or distorted." Catholic author John M. Todd calls the bull "contradictory, lacking in charity, and incidentally far less effective than it might have been". In part, this evasion was simply an unavoidable consequence of the fact that Luther did not fully articulate his mature theological position until some time after this bull had been issued. Even so, Eck did not afford the committee sufficient time to better grasp the core issues at stake in Luther's teachings. As a result, some of the censured propositions are ambiguous, peripheral to Luther's main concerns, or were misunderstood or misrepresented by the committee. At least twelve of the forty-one propositions fail to accurately quote Luther or misrepresent his beliefs. The bull itself contains an internal contradiction: at one point it orders all of Luther's works to be burned, but elsewhere restricts this censorship only to those works which contain one of the forty-one censored propositions.

Proposition 33

The censure of certain theological propositions in this bull continues to be a source of controversy. For example, proposition number 33 censured by this bull states: "It is contrary to the will of the Spirit that heretics be burned." However, the declaration Dignitatis Humanae of Vatican II states that "the human person has a right to religious freedom", and that "[t]his freedom means that all men are to be immune from coercion on the part of individuals or of social groups and of any human power, in such wise that no one is to be forced to act in a manner contrary to his own beliefs, whether privately or publicly, whether alone or in association with others, within due limits", seem to have softened.

Eastern Orthodox author Laurent Cleenewerck asserts that Leo X's condemnations technically satisfy the requirements of an infallible definition, in accordance with the criteria laid down by Vatican I. The declaration of Leo X that members of the Catholic faithful must "condemn, reprobate, and reject completely each of these theses or errors" on pain of an automatic excommunication is said to constitute an authoritative papal definition on doctrinal matters concerning faith and morals which must be held by the whole Catholic Church. He then notes that the practice of burning heretics poses a "serious ethical problem" and thus Cleenewerck finds in  support for his conclusion that "the idea that Papal Infallibility can be presented as independent of any conciliar consent and as 'the constant belief of the universal Church' is rejected."

Others disagree with those assessments and advance the alternative view that a censure that may be heretical but may also be merely "scandalous", "offensive to pious ears" or "seductive of simple minds" cannot be accepted as an infallible utterance of the Magisterium. Brian Harrison argues that a censure of an unspecified nature is potentially subject to future clarification or reform, unlike an ex cathedra definition, which is, by nature, irreformable. A second argument advanced here asserts that censures that are merely "scandalous", "offensive to pious ears" or "seductive of simple minds" strongly depend upon a particular context of certain historical or cultural circumstances. A proposition that causes scandal or offense when it is advanced within a particular context "may not necessarily be so noxious under different circumstances". Even if a proposition is essentially true but poorly worded or advanced in a particular context with the intent of provoking scandal or offense, it may be censured as "scandalous" or "offensive to pious ears".

Manuscript copies

Notes

References

Sources

External links
Latin Text of Exsurge Domine
English Translation of Exsurge Domine

16th-century anti-Protestantism
Martin Luther
1520 documents
16th-century papal bulls
Documents of Pope Leo X
1520 in Christianity